German submarine U-670 was a Type VIIC U-boat of Nazi Germany's Kriegsmarine during World War II. The submarine was laid down on 25 November 1941 at the Howaldtswerke yard at Hamburg, launched on 15 December 1942, and commissioned on 26 January 1943 under the command of Oberleutnant zur See Guido Hyronimus.

Design
German Type VIIC submarines were preceded by the shorter Type VIIB submarines. U-670 had a displacement of  when at the surface and  while submerged. She had two shafts and two  propellers.

U-670 was fitted with five  torpedo tubes (four fitted at the bow and one at the stern), fourteen torpedoes, one  SK C/35 naval gun, 220 rounds, and two twin  C/30 anti-aircraft guns. The boat had a complement of between forty-four and sixty.

Service history
Attached to 5th U-boat Flotilla based at Kiel, U-670 collided during training in the Baltic Sea with the target ship Bolkoburg and sank on 20 August 1943. Of her crew of 43, 22 survived while 21 perished in the accident.

References

Bibliography

External links

German Type VIIC submarines
1942 ships
Ships built in Hamburg
U-boats commissioned in 1943
U-boats sunk in 1943
U-boats sunk in collisions
Maritime incidents in August 1943
World War II shipwrecks in the Baltic Sea
World War II submarines of Germany